Franz + Polina is a 2006 Russian war romance film set in 1943 in occupied Belarus. It tells the story of Franz, a Waffen-SS soldier who deserts, and Polina, a Belarusian woman whose village is razed and people massacred.

The film received several accolades, including the 2007 FIPA D'Or Grand Prize.

Plot 
Franz stays at a Belarusian village and falls in love with Polina. The Nazis settled as friendly sympathizers in an effort to gain the confidence of the villagers while they await the order burn the villages to the ground and kill the inhabitants. Franz kills his commanding NCO after he attempts to kill Polina’s mother and Franz's new found love Polina. When her partisan brother returns he whispers to Polina to get Franz away and she passes Franz off as her deaf-mute brother. Polina became pregnant after they briefly settled in a log cabin in the woods.

Always on the run, Polina is shot by a collaborator but saved by Franz as they join a band of refugees. Franz kills a German soldier for his uniform and infiltrates a nearby village to obtain an antibiotic to treat Polina's wound. When he returns he is already delirious with typhoid fever and accidentally reveals his national identity by slurring in German. The refugees are sympathetic with the exception of a small boy, the sole survivor of a family that was lured back to the village by the seemingly humane behavior of the Waffen-SS. He has a gun, bought with his father's watch, and his adoptive mother and sister are unable to dissuade him from using it on Franz. They warn Polina and soon the pair are on the run again.

Their escape is interrupted by a German patrol which in turn is ambushed by partisans. After this rescue Franz is at the river bank retrieving water for pregnant Polina when the boy appears with the gun. The movie closes with the boy returning with the water and comforting a screaming Polina.

Cast
 Adrian Topol as Franz
 Svetlana Ivanova as Polina
 Tamara Mironova as Kucherikha
 Uwe Jellinek as Otto
 Valentin Makapura as Kazik
 Erika Bulataya as Kazik's sister
 Natalia Gorbatenko as Kazik's mother
 Andrey Merzlikin as Pavel

DVD release
The notes on the DVD case compare the lovers to Romeo and Juliet. Their differing nationalities are stressed by printing the title in two alphabets, namely as Franz + Полина.

References

External links
 
 Film's official website
 About the film by Denise J. Youngblood, University of Vermont

2006 films
Belarusian-language films
2000s Russian-language films
2000s German-language films
2000s war drama films
2006 romantic drama films
War romance films
Russian war drama films
Russian romantic drama films
Eastern Front of World War II films
Films set in Belarus
Films set in 1943
2006 drama films
Films about deserters
Partisan films
2006 multilingual films
Russian multilingual films
Russian World War II films